McWherter is a surname. Notable people with the surname include:

 Mike McWherter (born 1955), American lawyer, businessman, and politician
 Ned McWherter (1930–2011), American politician

Surnames of Scottish origin